Nichka-Bulyak (Neskäbuläk) is a rural locality (a village) in Chukadybashevsky Selsoviet, Tuymazinsky District, Bashkortostan, Russia. The population was 41 as of 2010. There is 1 street.

Geography 
Nichka-Bulyak is located 50 km southeast of Tuymazy (the district's administrative centre) by road. Chukadybashevo is the nearest rural locality.

References 

Rural localities in Tuymazinsky District